Sanave Thomas Arattukulam (born 21 May 1980) is an Indian badminton player. He won bronze medal at the 2006 Commonwealth Games and silver medal at the 2010 Commonwealth Games in mixed team event. He was the gold medalists at the 2006 and 2010 South Asian Games in the men's doubles and team events, also won silver medal in the mixed doubles in 2010.

Achievements

South Asian Games 
Men's doubles

Mixed doubles

BWF Grand Prix 
The BWF Grand Prix had two levels, the BWF Grand Prix and Grand Prix Gold. It was a series of badminton tournaments sanctioned by the Badminton World Federation (BWF) which was held from 2007 to 2017.

Men's doubles

  BWF Grand Prix Gold tournament
  BWF Grand Prix tournament

BWF International Challenge/Series 
Men's doubles

Mixed doubles

  BWF International Challenge tournament`
  BWF International Series tournament

References

External links 
 

1980 births
Living people
Racket sportspeople from Kerala
Indian male badminton players
Badminton players at the 2002 Commonwealth Games
Badminton players at the 2006 Commonwealth Games
Badminton players at the 2010 Commonwealth Games
Commonwealth Games silver medallists for India
Commonwealth Games bronze medallists for India
Commonwealth Games medallists in badminton
Badminton players at the 2006 Asian Games
Badminton players at the 2010 Asian Games
Asian Games competitors for India
South Asian Games gold medalists for India
South Asian Games silver medalists for India
South Asian Games medalists in badminton
Medallists at the 2006 Commonwealth Games
Medallists at the 2010 Commonwealth Games